Shaykh Jawhar Haydar Ali (or Jawhar bin Haydar bin Ali) was a mystic and Islamic scholar of Shonke, southeast Wollo, Ethiopia. He was usually referred to as the Shayk of Shonke, Shonkeyy and Abbayye (‘my father’).

Sudanese author Abd al-Aziz Abd al-Ghani Ibrahim marvelously described Shaykh Jawhar in his book, Ahl al-Bilal: Judhur al-islam al-ta’rikhiyya fi’l-habasha, as: "[Shaykh Jawhar was] one of the sources of pride for Abyssinia, one of the greatest scholars, a prominent [religious] leader, an exalted teacher, a possessor of the banner of knowledge, good works an exalted teacher asceticism, to whom the prominent men of the country traveled to obtain benefits from him”

Early life 
Shaykh Jawhar was born around 1837 at Danna, a village about 10km northwest of Kombolcha, South Wollo, Ethiopia. His parents, Hayder Ali and Misk al-Anbar, belonged to Illustrious and pious Muslim chiefly family. His uncle was al-Shaykh Sayid Aman of Gissir, a well-known Shafi jurist.

Education 
He got Islamic education from different scholars like: Shaykh Bushra of Karbana, Mohammed Shaykh, Muhammed of Ifat and Khalil of Mofa in Dawway

Sufi-Order 
Shaykh Jawhar was initiated into Qadiri order by Shayk Jamal al-Din b. Muhammad al-Anni and into Sammani order by Amir Husayn b. Abd al-Wahid, the grandson of famous Sudanese mystic Shaykh Ahmed al-Tayib b. al-Bashir.

Influence 
He trained countless disciples and influenced numerous adherents.  Renowned graduates of His school include: Shaykh ‘Ali Sayid b. Yahya b. Bashir Dullati , Al-Hajj Ilyas b. Yusuf, Shaykh Dawud Walasma, Shaykh Al-Hajj Bashir, Shaykh Ahmed al-Busayri of Chiffata, Shaykh Abd al-Samad b. ‘Ali of Gaddo Chaffe, Shaykh al-Faqih Sa’id of Shabbat, Al-Hajj ‘Umar of Dawudo, Shaykh Adam of Qattataye in Warra Babbo, Shaykh Idris of Borana and so on.

Legacy 
Today, his mosque is known by the Muslim community as Shonkey’s Mosque. A mosque is also built in Addis Ababa, around the French Embassy, for his commemoration.

References

1830s births
1937 deaths
19th-century Muslim theologians